Salvatore Antonio Nobile (born 12 January 1964 in Copertino, Italy) is an Italian former football player and manager, who is managing Malagasy team Fosa Juniors.

He played for U.S. Lecce, Reggina Calcio, Internazionale, A.C. Cesena, Pescara Calcio, Virtus Casarano and U.S.D. Atletico Catania before moving into management.  He managed Frattese, Galatina, Tricase, Gallipoli, Nuova Nardò Calcio, Manduria and Africa Sports National, which released him in April 2009.

References

1964 births
Living people
Italian footballers
Serie A players
Serie B players
U.S. Lecce players
Reggina 1914 players
Inter Milan players
A.C. Cesena players
Delfino Pescara 1936 players
Italian football managers
Association football defenders